Pearl Lust is a 1936 Australian film directed by A. R. Harwood. It was shot in 16mm and was never released theatrically as it was aimed at the home movie market.

Production
The movie was a South Seas romance, shot on location in Portsea and at Cinesound Production's studio in St Kilda. Filming took place in August and September 1936.

It was the first film produced under quota requirements in Victoria.

Cast
Fay Revel
John Bowden
George Edwards
Lance Nicholls
Fred McNaughten
George Arthur

References

External links
Pearl Lust at National Film and Sound Archive

1936 films
Australian black-and-white films